Santa Cruz Futebol Clube, usually known as Santa Cruz or Santa Cruz de Natal, is a Brazilian football club from Natal, Rio Grande do Norte.

Santa Cruz is currently ranked fifth among Rio Grande do Norte teams in CBF's national club ranking, at 163rd place overall.

History
Originally founded in 1934 as Santa Cruz Esporte e Cultura, the club won one Campeonato Potiguar in 1943 before ceasing activities in the early 1960s. In 1965, the club was refounded as Santa Cruz Futebol Clube.

Santa Cruz subsequently spent more than 30 years without playing, only returning to amateur competitions in 2011. Four years later, the club entered in the second division of the Potiguar, finishing second and missing out promotion as only the champion moved up to the first division.

In 2017, after being crowned champions of the second division in the previous year, Santa Cruz returned to the first division after more than 50 years, and narrowly avoided relegation. In 2018, the club finished in an impressive 3rd place, qualifying to the following year's Série D and the Copa do Brasil.

References

External links
FNF team profile 
Soccerway team profile

Association football clubs established in 1934
1934 establishments in Brazil
Association football clubs established in 1965
1965 establishments in Brazil
Football clubs in Rio Grande do Norte